Oda Senior High School (ODASCO) is a co-educational second-cycle institution in Akim Oda, situated in the Birim Central Municipal District in the Eastern Region of Ghana.

History 
The school was established in 1960 with only 95 students.

Enrollment 
As of 2015, Oda Senior High School had a student population of 2,242 students.

Headmasters

Alumni 

 Paa Kwesi Bekoe Amissah Arthur, former vice president of Ghana

 Akua Sarpong-Ayisa, Ghanaian entrepreneur

 Sammy Flex, journalist

 Adarkwah Evans, Entrepreneur
Jackline Agyeiwaa Asiedu (Young Entrepreneur)

References

High schools in Ghana
Education in Accra
Educational institutions established in 1960
Public schools in Ghana